David Lammy (born 19 July 1972) is an English politician and lawyer serving as Shadow Secretary of State for Foreign, Commonwealth and Development Affairs since 2021. A member of the Labour Party, he has been Member of Parliament (MP) for Tottenham since the 2000 Tottenham by-election.

Lammy was a Minister under Tony Blair and Gordon Brown, most recently as Minister of State for Universities in the Brown ministry. He served as Shadow Secretary of State for Justice from 2020 to 2021 and has served as Shadow Secretary of State for Foreign, Commonwealth and Development Affairs in Keir Starmer's Shadow Cabinet since November 2021.

Since 2019, Lammy has received the highest income on top of his MP’s salary amongst Labour Party MPs.

Early life and education
Lammy was born on 19 July 1972 in Whittington Hospital in Archway, North London, to Guyanese parents David and Rosalind Lammy. He and his four siblings were raised solely by his mother, after his father left the family when Lammy was 12 years old. Lammy speaks publicly about the importance of fathers and the need to support them in seeking to be active in the lives of their children. He chairs the All-Party Parliamentary Group on Fatherhood and has written on the issue.

Lammy grew up in Tottenham, and was educated at Downhills Primary School there, followed by the awarding of an Inner London Education Authority choral scholarship, at the age of 10, to sing at Peterborough Cathedral and attend The King's School, Peterborough. He studied at the School of Law, School of Oriental and African Studies (SOAS), University of London, graduating with a 2:1. Lammy went on to study at Harvard University, where he became the first black Briton to attend Harvard Law School; there he studied for a Master of Laws degree and graduated in 1997. He was called to the bar of England and Wales in 1994 at Lincoln's Inn. He was employed as an attorney at Howard Rice in California from 1997 to 1998, and with D.J. Freeman from 1998 to 2000. He is a visiting lecturer at SOAS. Lammy is also a presenter on LBC and hosts a weekly Sunday show, from 10am to 1pm.

Political career
In 2000 he was elected for Labour on the London-wide list to the London Assembly. During the London election campaign Lammy was selected as the Labour candidate for Tottenham when Bernie Grant died. He was elected to the seat in a by-election held on 22 June 2000. Aged 27, he was the youngest Member of Parliament (MP) in the house until 2003 when Sarah Teather was elected.

Minister
In 2002, he was appointed by Prime Minister Tony Blair as Parliamentary Under-Secretary of State in the Department of Health. In 2003, Lammy was appointed by Blair as a Parliamentary Under-Secretary of State in the Department for Constitutional Affairs and while a member of the Government, he voted in favour of authorisation for Britain to invade Iraq in 2003. After the 2005 general election, Blair appointed Lammy as Minister for Culture at the Department of Culture, Media and Sport.

In June 2007, new Prime Minister Gordon Brown demoted Lammy to the rank of Parliamentary Under-Secretary of State in the Department for Innovation, Universities and Skills. In October 2008, he was promoted by Brown to Minister of State and appointed to the Privy Council. In June 2009, Brown appointed Lammy as Minister for Higher Education in the new Department for Business, Innovation and Skills, leading the Commons ministerial team as Lord Mandelson was Secretary of State. He held the position until May 2010 when Labour lost the election.

Opposition backbencher

After Labour lost the 2010 general election, a Labour Party leadership contest was announced. During the contest Lammy nominated Diane Abbott, saying that he felt it was important to have a diverse field of candidates, but nonetheless declared his support for David Miliband. After the election of Ed Miliband, Lammy pledged his full support but turned down a post in the Shadow Cabinet, asserting a need to speak on a wide range of issues that would arise in his constituency due to the "large cuts in the public services".

In 2010 there were suggestions that Lammy might stand for election as Mayor of London in 2012. Lammy pledged his support to Ken Livingstone's bid to become the Labour London mayoral candidate, declaring him "London's Mayor in waiting". Lammy became Livingstone's selection campaign chair. In 2014, Lammy announced that he was considering entering the race to become Mayor of London in the 2016 election.

Following the party's defeat in the 2015 general election, Lammy was one of 36 Labour MPs to nominate Jeremy Corbyn, whom he is good friends with, as a candidate in the Labour leadership election of 2015.

London mayoral candidate

On 4 September 2014, Lammy announced his intention to seek the Labour nomination for the 2016 mayoral election. In the London Labour Party's selection process, he secured 9.4% of first preference votes and was fourth overall, behind Sadiq Khan, Tessa Jowell, and Diane Abbott.

In March 2016, he was fined £5,000 for instigating 35,629 automatic phone calls urging people to back his mayoral campaign without gaining permission to contact the party members concerned. Lammy apologised "unreservedly" for breach of the Privacy and Electronic Communication Regulations. It was the first time a politician had been fined for authorising nuisance calls.

Return to the frontbench
Lammy endorsed Keir Starmer and Angela Rayner in the 2020 Labour leadership and deputy leadership elections. After Starmer was elected Labour leader in April 2020, Lammy was appointed to the Shadow Cabinet as Shadow Secretary of State for Justice. 

In the November 2021 Shadow Cabinet reshuffle, Lammy was promoted to Shadow Secretary of State for Foreign, Commonwealth and Development Affairs.

Lammy attended the 2022 Bilderberg meeting in Washington, D.C.

In August 2022, an inquiry found that he had inadvertently breached the MPs' code of conduct. He apologised in a letter to Parliamentary Standards Commissioner Kathryn Stone.

In January 2023, Lammy visited Northern Ireland with Shadow Secretary Peter Kyle and Shadow Cabinet Office Minister Jenny Chapman, visiting Foyle Port to make a statement on the Northern Ireland Protocol.

Views

Crime
Over his years in politics, Lammy has publicly attributed blame for certain crimes to various specific causes and persons. He has also talked about black and ethnic minority peoples, especially those who are younger, their relation with crime and how they are treated by the criminal justice system.

On 11 August 2011, in an address to Parliament, Lammy attributed part of the cause for England's riots of a few days earlier to destructive "cultures" that had emerged under the prevailing policies. He also stated that legislation restricting the degree of violence that parents are allowed to use when disciplining their children was partly to blame for current youth culture, that had contributed to the riots.

Lammy blamed Prime Minister Boris Johnson, Home Secretary Amber Rudd, and Mayor Sadiq Khan for failing to take responsibility over fatal stabbings in London; he also blames inequality, high youth unemployment among black males, and local authorities cutting youth services and outreach programmes.

Lammy has stated that the criminal justice system deals with "disproportionate numbers" of young people from black and ethnic minority communities: despite saying that although decisions to charge were "broadly proportionate", he has asserted that black and ethnic minority people still face and perceive bias. Lammy said that young black people are nine times more likely to be incarcerated than "comparable" white people, and proposed a number of measures including a system of "deferred prosecution" for young first time offenders to reduce incarcerations. Lammy has claimed that black and ethnic minority people offend "at the same rates" as comparable white people "when taking age and socioeconomic status into account"; however, they were more likely to be stopped and searched, if charged, more likely to be convicted, more likely to be sent to prison and less likely to get support in prison.

Issues of race, prejudice and equality
Lammy has commented on Britain's history of slavery. He has also criticised the University of Oxford for admitting relatively few black students and students from disadvantaged backgrounds. He believes the Windrush scandal concerns injustice to a generation who are British, have made their homes and worked in Britain and deserve to be treated better.

On 5 February 2013, Lammy gave a speech in the House of Commons on why he would be voting in favour of the Marriage (Same Sex Couples) Bill 2013, critically comparing the relegation of British same-sex couples to civil partnerships to the "separate but equal" legal doctrine that justified Jim Crow laws in the 20th-century United States.

In January 2016, Lammy was commissioned by then-Prime Minister David Cameron to report on the effects of racial discrimination and disadvantage on the procedures of the police, courts, prisons and the probation service. Lammy published his report in September 2017, concluding that prosecutions against some BAME suspects should be delayed or dropped outright to mitigate racial bias.

He has spoken out against antisemitism within the Labour Party, and attended an Enough is Enough rally protesting against it. Lammy stated that antisemitism has "come back because extremism has come back" and is damaging support for Labour among Britain's Jewish community. He is a member of Labour Friends of Israel.

Lammy recorded a Channel 4 documentary for Remembrance Sunday called The Unremembered: Britain's Forgotten War Heroes, which was broadcast on 10 November 2019. In it he reveals how Africans who died in their own continent serving Britain during WWI were denied the honour of an individual grave, despite the Commonwealth War Graves Commission's reputation for equality. The documentary was produced by Professor David Olusoga's production company; Olusoga described the failure to commemorate black and Asian service personnel as one of the "biggest scandals" he had ever come across.

The documentary inspired an investigation by the Commonwealth War Graves Commission. The subsequent report found that "pervasive racism" underpinned the failure to properly commemorate service personnel. The report stated that up to 54,000 casualties of "certain ethnic groups" did not receive the same remembrance treatment as white soldiers who had died and another 350,000 military personnel recruited from east Africa and Egypt were not commemorated by name or even at all. In April 2021, Prime Minister Boris Johnson offered an "unreserved apology" over the findings of the review. Secretary of State for Defence Ben Wallace apologised in the House of Commons, promising to make amends and take action. Lammy, who was critical to bringing the matter to light, called this a "watershed moment".

Lammy considers himself English; he said: "I'm of African descent, African-Caribbean descent, but I am English." In March 2021, Lammy was a guest on LBC when he rejected a caller's assertion that the dual identity of African-Caribbean descent and English nationality are impossible.

Home Office security
In October 2022, Lammy called for a full investigation into an alleged security breach by Suella Braverman. Lammy said: "The home secretary is the most serious job you could have in our state. This is a person who makes judgements about terrorism and counter-terrorism, who makes judgements about very, very serious offenders, whether they should be allowed out of prison, and for that reason, it's someone who, I'm afraid, judgement is critically important. I'm afraid this is a lapse of judgement that, quite rightly, she was sacked for. The question is, why was she brought back?"

Other views
Lammy described the Grenfell Tower fire as "corporate manslaughter" and called for arrests to be made; his friend Khadija Saye died in the fire. He also criticised the authorities for failing to say how many people had died. He has written about what he believes to be the shortcomings of the housing market.

Lammy is a staunch advocate of British membership of the European Union. On 23 June 2018, Lammy appeared at the People's Vote march in London to mark the second anniversary of the referendum to leave the European Union. The People's Vote was a campaign group calling for a public vote on the final Brexit deal between the UK and the European Union. On 30 December 2020 he voted for the Brexit deal negotiated by Boris Johnson's Government.

He supports shared parental leave, which he maintains would "normalise" fathers being an equal parent with the mother, and would mean they become more involved in the raising of children, arguing that the barriers to "fathers playing a deeper role in family life" are not just legislative, but also cultural. He points out Scandinavian countries such as Sweden as examples of where governments have successfully made this happen, which he states has also helped increase gender equality.

Comments attracting criticism
In 2013, Lammy accused the BBC of making a "silly innuendo about the race" on Twitter during the announcement of the next Pontiff where the BBC tweeted "will smoke be black or white?" in reference to smoke above the Sistine Chapel. Lammy criticised the BBC's tweet as "crass and unnecessary." He subsequently apologised after other Twitter users pointed out the role played by black and white smoke in announcing the election of a new Pope.

In January 2016 Lammy claimed that one million Indians sacrificed their lives during the Second World War, not for the survival of Britain and to fight Nazism, but instead for the "European Project."; the statement was strongly criticised and ridiculed by The Spectator.

In 2017, writing in The Guardian, Lammy argued that Comic Relief perpetuated problematic stereotypes of Africa, and that they had a responsibility to use its powerful position to move the debate on in a more constructive way by establishing an image of African people as equals. His comments came after a video featuring Ed Sheeran meeting and rescuing a child in Liberia was criticised as "poverty porn" and was given the "Rusty Radiator" award for the 'most offensive and stereotypical fundraising video of the year'. In 2018, in response to Lammy's comments and the backlash to Sheeran's video, Comic Relief announced they would take steps towards change by halting their use of celebrities for appeals.

In February 2019, Lammy criticised Stacey Dooley for photographs she posted on social media of her trip to Uganda for Comic Relief, and said that "the world does not need any more white saviours", and that she was "perpetuating 'tired and unhelpful stereotypes' about Africa". He also stated however, that he does not question her "good motives". The donations received for the Red Nose Day broadcast in March 2019 fell by £8 million and the money raised that year was the lowest since 2007, which some have blamed on Lammy's remarks. Critics of his view included Wikipedia founder Jimmy Wales and Conservative Party MP Chris Philp. Lammy responded to criticism with a statement in which he referred to the decline in donations being due to contributing factors of austerity, declining viewing figures, trends in the charity sector and format fatigue and that he hoped his comments "would inspire the charity to refresh its image and think harder about the effects its output has on our perceptions of Africa".

In October 2020, as a result of Lammy's intervention, Comic Relief announced it would stop sending celebrities to Africa for its fundraising films. They stated that they would no longer send celebrities to Africa nor portray Africa with images of starving people or critically ill children, instead, they would be using local filmmakers to provide a more "authentic" perspective and give agency back to African people.

In January 2019, Lammy described Rod Liddle having a column in a weekly newspaper as a "national disgrace" and accused Liddle of having "white middle class privilege" for expressing the view that absent fathers played a role in violent crime involving black youths. Writing in an article for The Spectator, Liddle disputed Lammy's claim that he was raised in a family reliant on tax credits, which were not introduced in the United Kingdom until Lammy was aged 31.

In April 2019, Lammy was criticised for saying his comparison of the Brexit European Research Group (which consists of Conservative MPs) to Nazis and proponents of the South African apartheid was "not strong enough".

Personal life
Lammy married the artist Nicola Green in 2005; the couple have two sons and a daughter. Lammy is a Christian. He is also a Tottenham Hotspur F.C. fan. He states that his identity is "African, African-Caribbean, British, English, a Londoner and European". "I'm black, I'm English, I'm British and I'm proud."

In November 2011, he published a book, Out of the Ashes: Britain After the Riots, about the August 2011 riots. In 2020, he published his second book, Tribes, which explored social division and the need for belonging.

Lammy features as one of the 100 Great Black Britons on both the 2003 and 2020 lists. He has regularly been included in the Powerlist as one of the most influential people in the UK of African/African-Caribbean descent, including the most recent editions published in 2020 and 2021.

Honours
 He was sworn in as a member of Her Majesty's Most Honourable Privy Council in 2008. This gave him the honorific prefix "The Right Honourable" for life.
 He has been elected as a Fellow of the Royal Society of Arts; this gave him the Post Nominal Letters "FRSA" for as long as he remains a Fellow.

Notes

References

External links

 

 David Lammy MP - Westminster Parliamentary Research
 
 David Lammy on LBC

|-

|-

|-

|-

|-

1972 births
Activists against antisemitism
Living people
Alumni of SOAS University of London
Anglican socialists
British Christian socialists
English people of Guyanese descent
Harvard Law School alumni
Labour Members of the London Assembly
Labour Party (UK) MPs for English constituencies
Labour Friends of Israel
People educated at The King's School, Peterborough
People from Harringay
People from Tottenham
UK MPs 1997–2001
UK MPs 2001–2005
UK MPs 2005–2010
UK MPs 2010–2015
UK MPs 2015–2017
UK MPs 2017–2019
UK MPs 2019–present
Members of the Privy Council of the United Kingdom
Ministers for Universities (United Kingdom)
LBC radio presenters
Black British MPs
British broadcaster-politicians